When Do We Start Fighting... is an album by British band Seafood, released in July 2001.

The track "What May Be The Oldest" originally featured on the b-side of the "Led By Bison" single from Seafood's previous album Surviving the Quiet.  The re-recorded version on When Do We Start Fighting... features vocals from former Madder Rose singer Mary Lorson.

Track listing
All songs written by Seafood.

"Intro" – 0:39
"Cloaking" – 2:34
"Western Battle" – 3:37
"Pleasurehead" – 4:00
"What May Be The Oldest" – 3:10
"People Are Underestimated" – 4:50
"Splinter" – 3:40
"In This Light Will You Fight Me?" – 5:14
"Desert Stretched Before The Sun" – 3:20
"Similar Assassins" – 4:31
"He Collects Dust" – 5:34
"Clueso" (hidden track) – 3:07

The track listing as given on the album's sleeve lists track 1 as "Cloaking", track 2 as "Western Battle" etc. omitting to mention that the album actually starts with "Intro".

On the album's initial release a limited edition of 5000 copies was produced in card sleeves with added multimedia content including movies, a diary, screensaver and a Seafood game.  Early copies of this limited edition were signed by the band.

The album was re-released in March 2002 with a bonus disc entitled Coursework featuring demos and live session tracks.  The Coursework CD was also available to order from Seafood's official website and features the following tracks:

"Cloaking (Demo)" – 2:34
"In This Light Will You Fight Me? (Demo)" – 4:59
"Similar Assassins (Demo)" – 3:45
"People Are Underestimated (Session track)" – 3:10
"What May Be The Oldest (Session track)" – 3:09
"Porchlight (Session track)" – 5:31

US track listing
"Intro"/"Splinter" – 4:17
"Western Battle" – 3:37
"What May Be The Oldest" – 3:10
"Pleasurehead" – 4:00
"Cloaking" – 2:34
"Similar Assassins" – 4:31
"People Are Underestimated" – 4:50
"Desert Stretched Before The Sun" – 3:20
"In This Light Will You Fight Me?" – 5:14
"He Collects Dust" – 5:34
"Clueso" (hidden track) – 3:07

Personnel
David Line - Vocals, guitars
Kevin Hendrick - Bass, vocals
Charles MacLeod - Guitars
Caroline Banks - Drums, vocals

additional musicians

Mary Lorson - Vocals on "What May Be The Oldest"
Scott McCloud - Spoken word on "He Collects Dust"
Pete de Boer - Additional screaming on "He Collects Dust"
Ben Hutchinson - Percussion
Eli Janney - Keyboards

References

2001 albums
Seafood (band) albums
Infectious Records albums